Emariannia is a genus of moths of the family Noctuidae.

Species
 Emariannia cucullidea Benjamin, 1933

References
Natural History Museum Lepidoptera genus database
Emariannia at funet

Cuculliinae